Eskolaite is a rare chromium oxide mineral (chromium(III) oxide Cr2O3).

Discovery and occurrence
It was first described in 1958 for an occurrence in the Outokumpu ore deposit of eastern Finland. It occurs in chromium bearing tremolite skarns, metamorphosed quartzites and chlorite bearing veins in Finland; in glacial boulder clays in Ireland and in stream pebbles in the Merume River of Guyana. It has also been recognized as a rare component in chondrite meteorites.

The mineral is named after the Finnish geologist Pentti Eskola (1883–1964).

Structure and physical properties

Eskolaite crystallizes with trigonal symmetry in the space group Rc and has the lattice parameters a = 4.95 Å and c = 13.58 Å at standard conditions. The unit cell contains six formula units. The lattice is analogous to that of corundum, with Cr3+ replacing Al3+.

See also
 List of minerals named after people

References

Chromium minerals
Oxide minerals
Trigonal minerals
Minerals in space group 167
Hematite group